Villa Saint Martin is a centre in Ignatian spirituality run by the Society of Jesus in Montreal, Quebec, Canada. It was the first residential spirituality centre in Canada. It was founded in 1913 and opened by the Archbishop of Montreal, Paul Bruchési. It is situated in the east of Pierrefonds-Roxboro next to Saint-Laurent in Montreal on the shore of the Rivière des Prairies.

History

Foundation
The first residential retreat in Canada happened in 1910 in Boucherville and was organized by Fr. Joseph Archambeault. Three years later a retreat house was purchased in L'Abord-à-Plouffe. It was within the parish of Saint-Martin in Laval, Quebec, which is why the centre became dedicated to Saint Martin.

On 2 November 1913, the Villa Saint Martin was opened by the Archbishop of Montreal, Paul Bruchési. Following the opening, the first retreat at the centre was led by Fr. Ruhlmann SJ and accompanied by the Archbishop of Winnipeg, Arthur Alfred Sinnott and the Apostolic Delegate to Canada, Peregrine Stagni.

The number of retreatants at the centre increased every year until World War II. After the end of the war, the house's main benefactor, who paid for its construction, Mr. Édouard Gohier financially struggled in the post-war economic collapse.

New site
In 1951, the current building for the centre was bought. It was originally built in 1900. The house was officially opened as a retreat house on 21 June 1953 by the Archbishop of Montreal, Paul-Émile Léger.

In the 1960s and 1970s the program of activities at the centre was expanded. The centre moved away from traditional weekend retreats for parish groups. More activity was focussed on married couples, and evening sessions were introduced. In the 1970s Alcoholics Anonymous groups started at the centre. In 1995, six- and eight-day retreats for smaller groups with personal spiritual directors were started. In 2001, more ecumenical projects were launched.

Overview
Retreats at the villa are based on the Spiritual Exercises of Ignatius of Loyola. A variety of retreats are offered, from the entire 30-day retreat to ones based on art, themed retreats, and retreats in daily life.

Exterior and grounds

See also
 Ignatian spirituality
 List of Jesuit sites

References

External links

 Villa Saint Martin site

Buildings and structures in Montreal
Ignatian spirituality
Spiritual retreats